Víctor Manuel Celorio Celorio (born July 27, 1957 in Mexico City) is a Mexican-American author, entrepreneur, inventor, and former union organizer. He is best known as the inventor of InstaBook, a digital printing technology. He lives and works in Gainesville, Florida.

Inventions

InstaBook

As an inventor, Celorio obtained patents for the technology popularly known as InstaBook or Book On Demand, as well as that of distributed printing technology in which a digital file is distributed among as many printing centers as required for immediate production and delivery.

In the late eighties, Celorio created a digital network of print on demand centers around Mexico City, and in the nineties he founded InstaBook Corporation, a company to market the technology that became known as Print on Demand or Book on Demand.

Kinetic Lung
In 2019 he received a patent for a technology that uses kinetic energy to process massive amounts of urban air; to locate and separate the toxic particles known as PM2.5 and PM10 which have been found to be poison for every living being.

In 2018 he founded the nonprofit organization Pulmón Urbano AC (Urban Lung Inc. In US) to deploy his technology in cities with contaminated urban air. After an initial test in 2017 in the city of León, in México, in June 2019 his foundation installed in Mexicali, Baja California, -the worst contaminated city in Mexico- the first network of Urban Lungs in the world. That network is composed of 300 Residential Lungs -hosted by volunteers at their homes-, and 10 Solar Lungs, hosted by 10 of the most prestigious universities and colleges of the city. Since June his organization self proclaimed this Urban Lung Network has been cleaning 3 million cubic meters of air each day, for a total of hundreds of millions of cubic meters of contaminated air to date and an effective reduction of a 35% in the amount of toxic particles PM2.5 and PM10 floating in the air of Mexicali at the end of October 2019, as was reported in a study presented to the California Air Resources Board by the head of the local nonprofit EconCiencia y Salud AC. The nonprofit Pulmon Urbano AC relied on independent and internationally well known companies such as PurpleAir  and VisualAir, to show, in real time, the daily reduction of polluted air in Mexicali achieved by the Urban Lung Network.

Bibliography
Celorio is also a writer and publisher of several books. In an interview published in The Seybold Report, written by George A. Alexander, (2002) Victor Celorio described his love affair with books since he was a child.  He knew he wanted to be a writer from the time he was 10 years old and he published his first short story at the age of 14 in a magazine called Al Sur del Sur.

As an author, Celorio has published six books, both in Spanish and in English. His titles include one of the first books ever distributed through the Internet. The book was entitled Proyecto Mexico (Blue Unicorn Editions Florida, 1995). This work is a political essay published in 1995 in which the author proposes that Mexico, his country of origin, lacks a long-term project as a country. Therefore, all political remedies to the problems affecting that country will lack a global goal and will be short term in nature. Thus, Mexico as a country will go from one short-term solution to the next short-term solution until a true national project is negotiated among all political parties.

Further reading
There have been about 200 articles about Celorio and his book-printing invention, written by, among others, The New York Times, Forbes, Seybold Report, Publishers Weekly, Chicago Tribune, and the Rochester Institute of Technology; and interviews in National Public Radio; etc.

This short list includes a few  of the US published articles as a sample. There have been articles written in many other countries (Canada, Mexico, Germany, Italy, India, China, etc.).

 Alexander, George A. "The InstaBook Maker: book printing eases into the bookstore", The Seybold Report: Analyzing Publishing Technologies, Seybold Publications.
 Callea, Donna. "E-publisher Makes Mark" Daytona Beach Press. Available online at Archives
 Edwards, Steve. "InstaBook Launches 'Books-On-Demand'", May 26, 2004, The Seybold Report: Analyzing Publishing Technologies, Seybold Publications. Available online at 
 Haack, Douglas F. "The Simpleton Author's Guide to"Self-Book Publishing and Printing", 04, 2000. Available online at 
 Kleper, Michael L. "The Handbook of Digital Publishing". Vol. II. By, Rochester Institute of Technology. Page 565, Published by Prentis Hall, 2000,  Encyclopedia of Printing Technologies in 2 Volumes. Available online at 
 Lapidus, Paul. "Helping authors get into print"  The Record, North Jersey News, July 12, 2006. Available online at 
 Lerner, Michael, "New technology prints books while you wait", Forbes Magazine, 06.04.99
 Mutter, John . "U.S. Debut for In-Store, On-Demand Machines" Publishers Weekly. 5/17/2004. Available online at 
 Nishi, Dennis.  "Publishing turns page with print on demand" Chicago Tribune Feb 14, 2004. Available online at 
 Taub, Eric A. "For Budding Authors, a Rapid-Fire Publisher", New York Times, June 10, 2004. Available online at 
 Zeitchik, Steven. "Jersey Bookseller Becomes Publisher, Too" Publishers Weekly Daily for Booksellers – 4/29/2004. Available online at 
 Zeitchik, Steven, "When We Are All Publishers" by Publishers Weekly NewsLine—4/28/2004. Available online at 
 Zelchenko, Peter, "Book-on-Demand Market Pursues Affordable Run of One," Seybold Report on Publishing Systems, vol. 30, no. 5 (Nov. 20, 2000), p. 8. Available online at

References

External links
 InstaBook official website
Pulmón Urbano AC official website

Living people
1957 births
Mexican company founders
Mexican inventors
Mexican male writers
Mexican emigrants to the United States
Writers from Mexico City
Businesspeople from Mexico City